The Monument to General Martínez Campos is an instance of public art in Madrid, Spain. It lies on the centre of the Plaza de Guatemala, in El Retiro.

History and description 
Years after some inconclusive lobbying by Antonio Berenguer and José Ibáñez Marín intending to promote the erection of a monument dedicated to Martínez Campos, the  resumed the initiative by organizing a popular subscription in 1904, succeeding in bringing on board many military officers. The project was awarded to Mariano Benlliure. The managing committee for the monument was constituted in 1905, with General Primo de Rivera as chairman.

Benlliure worked simultaneously in this project and in the Castelar's project.

A staircase pedestal made of white marble with 4 steps constitutes the base of the monument. A largely unpolished crag made of limestone from Tamajón lies on top of the marble plinth, creating the sense of being a natural feature.

The front side of the monument displays a war trophy cast in bronze consisting of two flags (cavalry and infantry) and additional wartime items, with an inscription carved above in the limestone reading  ("to General Martínez Campos, model of patriots and soldiers, Spain"). A relief carved in the limestone rock representing the battle of Castillejos extends across the left-hand and back sides of the crag, featuring an inscription in the marble below reading .

Cast in bronze in Barcelona by Masriera & Campins' foundry, the equestrian statue of Martínez Campos top it all off. 

The monument was unveiled on 28 January 1907, during a ceremony attended by Alfonso XIII and Victoria Eugenie, and Antonio Maura, among others.

The Council of Government of the Community of Madrid declared the monument as bien de interés cultural in 2013.

References 
Citations

Bibliography
 
 

Outdoor sculptures in Madrid
Equestrian statues in Madrid
Bronze sculptures in Spain
Sculptures by Mariano Benlliure
Sculptures of men in Spain
Statues of military officers
Monuments and memorials in Madrid
Bien de Interés Cultural landmarks in Madrid